Vaʻa is a word in Samoan, Hawaiian and Tahitian which means 'boat', 'canoe' or 'ship'. A larger traditional seagoing vessel for long-distance voyages is referred to as vaʻa tele (big ship). The term alia is also used for larger vessels in Samoa. The smaller vaʻa used for fishing typically have a float, or outrigger, attached to the main hull for stability. This outrigger part of the canoe is called ama in various Polynesian languages.

The word is cognate with other Polynesian words such as vaka or the Māori word waka. It is also used to designate the sport of outrigger canoe racing. Due to the extra stability created by an outrigger system, a modified version of the va'a canoe was included as a new Paralympic Games event from 2020.

Types of vaʻa

Samoa 
The Samoans have four kinds of canoes, smaller fishing vessels or the larger oceangoing va'a-tele or ʻalia, which are mostly out of use today;
 paopao A single outrigger canoe made from a single log;
vaʻa-alo A small fishing-canoe.
Large single canoes, termed respectively la'au lima (five-barred), or six or seven-barred, as the case might be, were canoes varying in length from thirty, fifty, sixty, and even seventy feet, as required. They were balanced by an outrigger firmly lashed to the canoe on the left side at a distance of three feet if meant for pulling, but of five or six feet if required for sailing. The single canoes have a light appearance, the prow and stern being slightly curved upwards, so that merely the bosom or central part of an unloaded canoe rests upon the water.
ʻalia. Samoan double canoe, va'a-tele (the big canoe), was much larger, and consisted of two canoes, one longer than the other, lashed together with cross-bars amidships, and having the thatched shed or cabin built upon a stage that projected over the stern, instead of in midships, as in the Tonga canoes. It was much larger than this canoe, but more difficult to manage, yet able to carry one or two Vaʻa-alo, or small fishing-canoes, on deck as required.

Construction 

A main hull of a vaʻa can be made in one piece, from a hollowed out trunk of a large tree with the ama float attached later. Other types of Polynesian construction include 'sewing' planks of wood together with special cords and ropes, a type of hand made sennit,  important in the material cultures of the people of Oceania.

Other meanings 

Vaʻa is also a surname in the Samoa Islands, and may refer to:
Earl Va'a (b. 1976), Samoan rugby player
Justin Va'a (b. 1978), Samoan rugby player

See also 

Culture of Samoa
Polynesian navigation
Hokulea
Wa'a

References

External links 
 Takia Outrigger Canoe Club Fiji

Samoan words and phrases
Samoan culture
Polynesian navigation
Outrigger canoes
Indigenous boats